LungA Art Festival is an annual art and music festival held in Seyðisfjörður, East Iceland in mid-July. The festival was founded in 2000 and is organized as a week of workshops, lectures and other activities, ending with a weekend of exhibitions and concerts.

In 2013 the festival sparked the creation of the LungA School, an art school and "independent, artist led institution".

Artists / Instructors 
Some of the artists and instructors who have been teaching at LungA Art Festival are: 
Saga Sigurðardóttir (dancer and choreographer)
Reykjavikurdætur (Icelandic feminist rap band)
Svala Björgvins (musician)
Sóley (musician, composer and performer)
Princess  Nokia
Ragnar Kjartansson
 David Þor Jónsson
 Henrik Vibskov
 Goddur
 Andri Snær Magnason
 Curver
 Hugleikur Dagsson
And many many more...

LungA is a part of the Keychange movement, working towards gender equality and equality in general.

References 

Art festivals in Iceland
Music festivals in Iceland
Summer events in Iceland